Miami Avenue is a Metromover station in Downtown, Miami, Florida.

This station is located at the intersection of South Miami Avenue and First Street. It opened to service April 17, 1986. Unlike some Metromover stations, it is not a free-standing structure, but instead, is built into the surrounding buildings as a "bridge" over Miami Avenue, adjacent to Miami's Macy's flagship store.

Station layout

Places of interest
Biscayne Building 
Courthouse Plaza 
Courthouse Tower 
Macy's Flagship Florida Store
Flagler Station Shopping Center 
Seybold Jewelry Center
The Children's Museum
New World Center
25 W. Flagler Street Building 
71 Flagler Street Building 
105 Flagler Street Building 
110 Flagler Street Building 
155 Flagler Street Building 
50 Miami Avenue Building
65 Miami Avenue Building
80 Miami Avenue Building
165 Miami Avenue Tower

External links
 MDT – Metromover Stations
 Miami Avenue entrance from Google Maps Street View

Metromover stations
Railway stations in the United States opened in 1986
1986 establishments in Florida